The Guggenheim UBS MAP Global Art Initiative is a five-year program, supported by Swiss bank UBS in which the Solomon R. Guggenheim Foundation identifies and works with artists, curators and educators from South and Southeast Asia, Latin America, and the Middle East and North Africa to expand its reach in the international art world. For each of the three phases of the project, the museum invites one curator from the chosen region to the Solomon R Guggenheim Museum in New York City for a two-year curatorial residency, where they work with a team of Guggenheim staff to identify new artworks that reflect the range of talents in their parts of the world. The resident curators organize international touring exhibitions that highlight these artworks and help organize educational activities. The Foundation acquires these artworks for its permanent collection and includes them as the focus of exhibitions that open at the museum in New York and subsequently travel to two other cultural institutions or other venues around the world.  The Foundation supplements the exhibitions with a series of public and online programs, and supports cross-cultural exchange and collaboration between staff members of the institutions hosting the exhibitions. UBS is reportedly contributing more than $40 million to the project to pay for its activities and the art acquisitions.  Foundation director Richard Armstrong commented: "We are hoping to challenge our Western-centric view of art history."

Phase 1: South and Southeast Asia
The first exhibition, No Country: Contemporary Art for South and Southeast Asia is curated by June Yap. Yap has worked for six years in the curatorial departments of modern and contemporary art museums, including the Institute of Contemporary Arts Singapore and the Singapore Art Museum.  She gathered art from Indonesia, Malaysia, Thailand, Myanmar, Vietnam, Cambodia, the Philippines, Bangladesh and India for No Country.  The exhibition was shown at the Solomon R. Guggenheim Museum in New York in 2013, the Asia Society Hong Kong Centre from October 2013 to February 2014, and  Singapore's Centre for Contemporary Art from May to July 2014.

In this show, the artists featured are as follows:

 Bani Abidi 
 Reza Afisina 
 Khadim Ali 
 Poklong Anading 
 Aung Myint
 Simryn Gill 
 Sheela Gowda
 Shilpa Gupta 
 Ho Tzu Nyen
 Amar Kanwar
 Kamin Lertchaiprasert 
 Vincent Leong 
 Tayeba Begum Lipi 
 Tuan Andrew Nguyen
 The Otolith Group 
 Sopheap Pich
 The Propeller Group 
 Araya Rasdjarmrearnsook
 Navin Rawanchaikul 
 Norberto Roldan 
 Arin Dwihartanto Sunaryo
 Tang Da Wu 
 Tran Luong 
 Truong Tan
 Vandy Rattana
 Wah Nu and Tun Win Aung 
 Wong Hoy Cheong

Phase 2: Latin America
The second exhibition of the project, Under the Same Sun: Art from Latin America Today, focuses on art from Latin America and is curated by Pablo León de la Barra. On display are works by 40 artists representing 15 countries in Latin America, including Argentina, Bolivia, Brazil, Chile, Colombia, Costa Rica, Cuba, Guatemala, Honduras, Mexico, Panama, Peru, Uruguay and Venezuela. The artworks are organized around five themes: Conceptualism and its Legacies, Tropicologies, Political Activism, Modernism and its Failures, and Participation/Emancipation. The show ran at the Solomon R. Guggenheim Museum in New York from June 13 to October 1, 2014, at Museo Jumex in Mexico City from November 19, 2015, to February 7, 2016, and recently opened at the South London Gallery in Camberwell, London on June 10, 2016, and will be on view until September 4, 2016.

In this show, the artists featured are as follows:

 Jennifer Allora and Guillermo Calzadilla
 Carlos Amorales
 Armando Andrade Tudela
 Alexander Apóstol
 Tania Bruguera
 Paulo Bruscky
 Luis Camnitzer
 Mariana Castillo Deball
 Alejandro Cesarco
 Raimond Chaves and Gilda Mantilla
 Donna Conlon and Jonathan Harker
 Adriano Costa
 Minerva Cuevas
 Jonathas de Andrade
 Wilson Díaz
 Juan Downey
 Rafael Ferrer
 Regina José Galindo
 Mario García Torres
 Dominique González-Foerster
 Tamar Guimarães
 Federico Herrero
 Alfredo Jaar
 Claudia Joskowicz
 Runo Lagomarsino
 David Lamelas
 Marta Minujín
 Carlos Motta
 Iván Navarro
 Rivane Neuenschwander
 Gabriel Orozco
 Damián Ortega
 Amalia Pica
 Wilfredo Prieto
 Paul Ramírez Jonas
 Beatriz Santiago Muñoz
 Gabriel Sierra
 Javier Téllez
 Erika Verzutti
 Carla Zaccagnini

In conjunction with Under the Same Sun, Alfredo Jaar's A Logo for America (1987), an animation for an electronic billboard in Times Square, was shown again in Times Square in August 2014 as part of Times Square Alliance's "Midnight Moments" series.

Artist Federico Herrero, whose work is displayed in Under the Same Sun, completed a residency at the South London Gallery from May to June 2016, during which he engaged with the local residents of Pelican Estate, Peckham and created a site-specific work in the children's playground of the community.

Phase 3: Middle East and Northern Africa
The UBS MAP Global Art Initiative culminates in a third and final exhibition titled, But a Storm is Blowing from Paradise: Contemporary Art of the Middle East and North Africa, curated by Sara Raza. The show opened on April 29, 2016, at the Solomon R. Guggenheim Museum in New York City and will be on view until October 5, 2016. The exhibition will travel to Istanbul's Pera Museum in 2017.

In this show, the artists featured are as follows:

 Kader Attia
 Abbas Akhavan
 Ergin Çavuşoğlu
 Lida Abdul
 Mariam Ghani
 Rokni Haerizadeh
 Susan Hefuna
 Iman Issa
 Nadia Kaabi-Linke
 Mohammed Kazem
 Ahmed Mater
 Ala Younis
 Zineb Sedira
 Ori Gersht
 Ali Cherri
 Joana Hadjithomas and Khalil Joreige
 Emily Jacir
 Gülsün Karamustafa
 Hassan Khan
 Nadia Kaabi-Linke

Hello Guggenheim: Film and Video Curated by Bidoun Projects was a four-week program of film and videos shown at the Solomon R. Guggenheim Museum in May 2016 about the politics and power of the moving image, organized by Bidoun Projects.

References

External links
 Official website

Visual arts exhibitions
Asian art
Contemporary art exhibitions
Latin American art
Solomon R. Guggenheim Foundation
Traveling exhibits